The Coinage Offences Act 1936 (26 Geo 5 & 1 Edw 8 c 16) was an Act of the Parliament of the United Kingdom which related to coinage offences. It was repealed by section 30 of, and Part II of the Schedule to, the Forgery and Counterfeiting Act 1981.

Mode of trial
From 1967 to 1971, offences under this Act, other than offences under sections 1(1)(a), 2, 9(1), 9(2) and 10 (which created certain offences in relation to coinage of higher denominations, to coining implements and to removal of coining implements, coin or bullion from the Mint) were triable by courts of quarter sessions other than courts with restricted jurisdiction.

From 1977, offences under sections 4(1), 5(1), 5(2), 5(3), 5(4), 5(6), 7 and 8 were triable either way.

Section 4
Section 4(1) created an offence of "defacing coins".

Section 4(4) was repealed by Part XIX of Schedule 1 to the Statute Law (Repeals) Act 1973.

Section 5
Section 5(1) created an offence of "uttering counterfeit coin".

Section 5(2) created an offence of "uttering counterfeit gold or silver coin".

Section 5(3) created an offence of "possession of counterfeit gold or silver coin".

Section 5(4) created an offence of "possession of counterfeit copper coin".

Section 5(6) created an offence of "uttering coins etc as gold or silver coins".

Section 7
This section created an offence of "importating and exporting counterfeit coin".

Section 8
This section created an offence of "making, possessing or selling medals resembling gold or silver coin".

Section 12
The words "penal servitude or" in section 12(1) were repealed by section 83(3) of, Part I of Schedule 10 to, the Criminal Justice Act 1948.

Sections 12(1) and 12(2)(a) were repealed by section 10(2) of, and Part III of Schedule 3 to, the Criminal Law Act 1967.

See also
Coinage Offences Act

References
Halsbury's Statutes. Third Edition. Volume 8. Page 317 et seq.
The Public General Acts and the Church Assembly Measures 1935 - 36. Printed by Eyre and Spottiswoode Ltd for the King's Printer. London. Volume I. Pages 509 to 521.
The Law Commission. Criminal Law: Report on Forgery and Counterfeit Currency. Law Com 55. 1973. Paragraphs 78 to 118, at pages 32 to 45.

External links

United Kingdom Acts of Parliament 1936